Alanduraiyar Temple is a Hindu temple in the village of Kilpaluvur in Ariyalur District of Tamil Nadu, India.

Speciality 
Dedicated to the god Shiva, the temple dates to remote antiquity and is associated with the 7th-century saint Thirugnanasambandar.  The temple is hims hymnsand is classified as Paadal Petra Sthalam.

It is believed that Parasurama worshipped here to get rid of the sin of killing his mother. The original brick temple was rebuilt in stone during the time of Parantaka Chola II and Uttama Chola.

References

Photo gallery

Shiva temples in Ariyalur district
Padal Petra Stalam
Rebuilt buildings and structures in India
Chola architecture